"Horse & Carriage" is the lead single from Cam'ron's debut album, Confessions of Fire. The song was produced by Trackmasters and Cam'ron's childhood friend Mase was featured on the song's hook.

Background
The song narrowly missed the top 40 of the Billboard Hot 100, peaking at number 41. It also was a top 10 hit on both the R&B and rap charts, peaking at number nine on both charts. "Horse & Carriage" was the most successful of the three singles released from the album as the two follow-up singles failed to make an impact on the charts. A remix was also released featuring Big Pun, Charli Baltimore, Silkk the Shocker and Wyclef Jean. It was produced by Darrell "Digga" Branch and sampled the opening theme to the 1980s TV series Night Court.

Music video
The video, directed by Lance Rivera, picks up right after the video 357. Cam'ron and Mase escape the subway and get into their cars. Cam'ron goes to the club and raps the song and ends the video with a pool scene. The video features cameos from Jim Jones, Styles P, Wyclef Jean, N.O.R.E., Funkmaster Flex, Charli Baltimore, DJ Clue?, Silkk the Shocker, Cormega and Canibus & 50 Cent. Though Mase is featured on the song he is not in the video due to wanting to be paid which Cam'Ron refused to do since they were close friends.

Track listing

A-Side
"Horse & Carriage" (Clean Version) - 4:02
"Horse & Carriage" (T.V. Track) - 4:02
"Horse & Carriage" (Instrumental) - 4:02
"Horse & Carriage" (A Cappella) - 4:02

B-Side
"Horse & Carriage" (Dirty Version) - 4:02
"Fuck You" (Dirty Version) - 2:36
"Fuck You" (T.V. Track) - 1:55

Charts

Weekly charts

Year-end charts

References

1998 singles
Cam'ron songs
Mase songs
Songs written by Cam'ron
1998 songs
Epic Records singles
Song recordings produced by Trackmasters